Lakshmipur Bagewa is a village development committee in Dhanusa District in the Janakpur Zone of south-eastern Nepal. At the time of the 1991 Nepal census it had a population of 5,490 persons living in 950 individual households. It has one government school, Sri Lakshminiya Janta Madhyamik Vidhiyalaya.

References

External links
UN map of the municipalities of Dhanusa District

Populated places in Dhanusha District